|}

The Prix Omnium II is a Listed flat horse race in France open to three-year-old thoroughbred colts and geldings. It is run over a distance of 1,600 metres (about 1 mile) at Saint-Cloud in late March or early April.

History
The event was originally called the Prix de Saint-Cloud. The first running was staged during the venue's inaugural fixture in 1901. It replaced the Prix de Vincennes, a similar race at Vincennes. It was initially contested over 2,100 metres.

The Prix de Saint-Cloud was cut to 2,000 metres in 1904. It was shortened to 1,600 metres after World War I. It continued with its original title until 1927.

The race was renamed in honour of Omnium II, a successful racehorse and sire, in 1928. It was run over 2,100 metres in 1929. From this point it was held on the same day as the Prix La Camargo, the equivalent race for fillies. It reverted to 1,600 metres in 1930.

The Prix Omnium II was held at Longchamp in 1940. It took place at Auteuil from 1941 to 1944.

The event can serve as a trial for the Poule d'Essai des Poulains. The last horse to win both races was Silver Frost in 2009.

Records
Leading jockey since 1979 (5 wins):
 Christophe Soumillon – Silver Frost (2009), Barocci (2011), Wire to Wire (2013), Salai (2014), Markazi (2017)

Leading trainer since 1979 (5 wins):
 Jean-Claude Rouget – Gris Tendre (2008), Wire to Wire (2013), Salai (2014), Green Sweet (2015), Markazi (2017)

Leading owner since 1979 (3 wins): (includes part ownership)

 Wertheimer et Frère – Medecis (2002), Green Sweet (2015), Shaman (2019)

Winners since 1979

Earlier winners

 1901: Juniperus
 1902: Barde
 1903: Nordenskjold
 1904: Borgia
 1905: Hanoi
 1906: Prestige
 1907: Pernod
 1908: Monitor
 1909: Verdun
 1910: Radis Rose
 1911: Faucheur
 1912: Le Cid
 1913: Saint Pe
 1914: Durbar
 1920: Deepdale
 1921: Spectateur
 1922: Grillemont
 1923: Guemul
 1924: Soldat de France
 1925: Burgos
 1926: Diplomate
 1927: Gros Chou
 1928: Guy Fawkes
 1929: Vatout
 1930: Montreal
 1931: Mameluck
 1932: Rustaud
 1933: Pantalon
 1934: Rentenmark
 1935: Nerondes
 1936: Sanguinetto
 1937: Allumeur
 1938: Becasson
 1939: Bon Voyage
 1940: Flying Call
 1941: Blue Mill
 1942: Express
 1943: Fanatique
 1944: Coadjuteur
 1948: Soritor
 1961: Carteret
 1964: Trade Mark
 1966: Prompt
 1967: Magic Wind
 1968: Aslam
 1973: Robertino
 1974: Mount Hagen
 1975: Condorcet
 1976: Far North
 1977: Water Boy
 1978: Kenmare

See also
 List of French flat horse races
 Recurring sporting events established in 1901 – this race is included under its original title, Prix de Saint-Cloud.

References

 France Galop / Racing Post:

 pedigreequery.com – Prix Omnium II – Saint-Cloud.

Flat horse races for three-year-olds
Saint-Cloud Racecourse
Horse races in France